Gladys Hanson (born Gladys Hanson Snook; September 5, 1884 – February 23, 1973) was a stage and silent film actress.

Early years
Hanson was born Gladys Hanson Snook, the youngest daughter of Mr. and Mrs. Peyton Harrison Snook.

Career 
Hanson began her career on the Broadway stage portraying the Duchess in The Spoiler in 1907 with the Charles Frohman Company. On the stage she played in the theatrical productions Our American Cousin (1908) with Edward Hugh Sothern, The Builder of Bridge (1909) with later film star Eugene O'Brien and The Governor's Lady (1912) with Emma Dunn and future film leading man Milton Sills.

In 1914 she began working in film for Famous Players and later worked for Universal and Essanay. Her last film appearance was Walls Tell Tales in 1928.

She starred in The Straight Road (Famous Players), The Evangelist and The Climbers (Lubin), The Primrose Path (Universal), and The Havoc (Essanay).

Personal life and death
On April 12, 1916, in Atlanta, Hanson married Charles Emerson Cook who represented her at Charles Emerson Cook Inc., but they later divorced. They had one child, Gladys-Irene Cook.

On February 23, 1973, Hanson died, aged 89.

Filmography

References

Bibliography
Raeburn, Eleanor, "Belasco's New Leading Woman", The Theatre Magazine, v.XVI n.140, October, 1912, p. 110.

External links
  Gladys Hanson portrait at NY Public Library Billy Rose Collection
 
 
 portraits(Univ. of Washington, Sayre)
 Stuart A. Rose Manuscript, Archives, and Rare Book Library

1884 births
1973 deaths
20th-century American actresses
Actresses from Atlanta
American film actresses
American silent film actresses
American stage actresses